Cassius Clay (soon Muhammad Ali) fought Billy Daniels in a ten-round boxing match at St. Nicholas Arena in New York City on May 19, 1962. Clay won the fight through a technical knockout when the referee stopped the fight in the seventh round. The fight featured a series of clinches and calls of "break" from the referee. Clay was ahead on points when the referee stopped the fight after a cut opened above Daniels' left eyebrow. At the time of the stoppage, referee Mark Conn had Clay ahead 5-1, and judges Artie Aidala and Leo Birnbaum had him in front 4-2.
Both Daniels and Clay had been undefeated up till this bout.

References

Daniels
1962 in boxing
May 1962 sports events in the United States